Centre Mills is a historic grist mill located at Miles Township, Centre County, Pennsylvania.  It was built in 1802-1803, and is a two-story fieldstone building, with a basement and attic.  It measures 44 feet, 10 inches, by 58 feet, and has a gable roof.  Also on the property are a barn, stone house, and miller's house.  The stone house was built in 1813, and is a two-story stone dwelling, measuring 40 feet by 30 feet, with a two-story frame addition.  It features a porch supported by Corinthian order columns.  The miller's house is a frame dwelling on a stone foundation.  The stone house is operated as a bed and breakfast.

It was added to the National Register of Historic Places in 1976.

References

External links
Centre Mills Bed and Breakfast website

Bed and breakfasts in Pennsylvania
Grinding mills on the National Register of Historic Places in Pennsylvania
Industrial buildings completed in 1803
Houses in Centre County, Pennsylvania
Grinding mills in Pennsylvania
National Register of Historic Places in Centre County, Pennsylvania